The 2005 Canadian Mixed Curling Championship was held November 21–28, 2004 at the Prince Albert Golf and Country Club in Prince Albert, Saskatchewan.

The 2005 Mixed was the 2nd Canadian Mixed Championship to be held in the 2004 calendar year, as the Canadian Curling Association moved the event from the Spring to the Fall. The Mixed has been held in the Fall ever since, and has been referred to the following calendar year ever since. The event also changed playoff formats, moving from the page playoff system to a 3-team playoff.

Newfoundland and Labrador won its first ever Mixed championship, as Mark Nichols, sister Shelley Nichols, Brent Hamilton and Jennifer Guzzwell from the St. John's Curling Club won the championship, defeating Saskatchewan in the final.

Teams

Standings

Tiebreaker
 8-4

Playoffs

References

External links
Event statistics

Canadian Mixed Curling Championship
Curling in Saskatchewan
2004 in Canadian curling
2004 in Saskatchewan
November 2004 sports events in Canada
Sport in Prince Albert, Saskatchewan